The 1998 Conference USA baseball tournament was the 1998 postseason baseball championship of the NCAA Division I Conference USA, held at Zephyr Field in New Orleans, Louisiana, from May 12 through 17.  defeated  in the championship game, earning the conference's automatic bid to the 1998 NCAA Division I baseball tournament.

Regular season results 

 Records reflect conference play only.

Bracket

Play-in games 
Two play-in games among the four teams with the worst regular season records decided which two teams would have the final two spots in the eight-team double-elimination bracket.

Double-elimination 

 Bold indicates the winner of the game.
 Italics indicate that the team was eliminated from the tournament.

All-tournament team

References 

Tournament
Conference USA Baseball Tournament
Conference USA baseball tournament
Conference USA baseball tournament
1990s in New Orleans
Baseball competitions in New Orleans
College baseball tournaments in Louisiana